How Loathsome is a series of goth, LGBT comics by Ted Naifeh and Tristan Crane. Originally published in 2003 in four separate issues, the series was released in a graphic novel format in 2004 by Comics Lit/NBM.

The story chronicles the misadventures of several, loosely connected residents of San Francisco, as it addresses issues of gender identity, sexuality, fetishism, drug use, and goth subculture.

How Loathsome received the Ninth Art Lighthouse award for "Best New Series" in 2003, and was runner-up for its "Best Bookshelf Comic" award in 2004.

References

NBM Publishing titles
LGBT-related graphic novels
American graphic novels
American LGBT novels
2000s LGBT novels
Bisexuality-related fiction
Goth subculture
2003 comics debuts
Novels set in San Francisco
2003 LGBT-related literary works